David Bakhshi is an English bridge player.

Bridge accomplishments

Wins

 Gold Cup (5) 2002, 2004, 2007, 2009, 2014 
 North American Bridge Championships (1)
 Silodor Open Pairs (1) 2013

Runners-up

 North American Bridge Championships (1)
 Vanderbilt (1) 2011

Notes

Year of birth missing (living people)
Living people
English contract bridge players